Nərimankənd or Narimankend may refer to:
Nərimankənd, Bilasuvar, Azerbaijan
Nərimankənd, Gadabay, Azerbaijan
Nərimankənd, Gobustan, Azerbaijan
Nərimankənd, Sabirabad, Azerbaijan
Qoşakənd, Azerbaijan